Nirula's is India's oldest fast food restaurant chain. Based in North India and most popular in the NCR Delhi, it was Delhi's first fast food restaurant, opening in Connaught Place in 1977. Today it has over 70 outlets in NCR Delhi, Haryana, Punjab, and Uttar Pradesh states, offering a "Desi" version of Western fast food items.

Nirula's success has led them to branch out into other ventures which include, ‘Potpourri’, an Indian cuisine, casual dining restaurant chain; ‘Nirula's 21’, ice cream parlour chain, in addition to pastry shops and two hotels in Noida and Panipat. Recently Nirula's opened its first franchise in Patna, their first outlet in the entire east zone.

History
The chain traces its origins to "Hotel India", which opened at the L-Block in Connaught Place (CP), New Delhi in 1934, by "Nirula Brothers", Lakshmi Chand Nirula and Madan Gopal Nirula; it had 12 rooms, a restaurant and a bar. In 1940,  on request of the Indian Coffee Board, they opened the Indian Coffee Shop on Queensway (now Janpath) introducing espresso coffee, which became an instant success. Soon afterwards they launched two theme restaurants —‘La ’, a Hungarian restaurant; and ‘Gufa’, an Indian restaurant. In the 1950s, the 'Chinese Room' was opened, the oldest Chinese restaurant in Delhi. It is still on its original premises.

The 1970s saw Nirula's venturing into the fast food business with the opening of what became Delhi's first fast food restaurant in 1977, to which was later added: a pastry shop, snack bar, hot shoppe, and an ice cream parlour. A subsequent addition was the adjacent, waiter-served "Potpourri" salad bar. By that time  Nirula's was already a CP landmark, offering Western fast food such as burgers, pizzas, and submarines, plus an ice cream parlour offering 21 flavours.

Expansion of the fast food business continued in the next two decades, with the opening of the ‘Central Kitchen’ and at the Chanakya cinema complex, Chanakyapuri, Defence Colony, Noida, Vasant Vihar, and various other locations in the NCR. Before the arrival of several international restaurant chains in the 1990s, Nirula's remained a major draw for young people in the capital. In the following years, even after chains like McDonald's made inroads into its share,  Nirula's retained 40 per cent of the Delhi market in 2000. Even then, facing stiff competition from Nirula's, McDonald's had to "Indianise" its menu to suit Indian palates, while on its end, Nirula's added competitive pricing and revamped its interiors.

To diversify its business, the group opened hotels, one in Noida and another in Panipat, and set up food processing plants in Noida, near Delhi.

Nirula's was also the first Western-style fast food restaurant in Kathmandu, Nepal, where it had two outlets, the main branch in Durbar Marg —where there currently is a KFC and a Pizza Hut on top, and a smaller branch on New Road. The best selling items were pizzas and ice cream. While both were already available in Kathmandu, they were offered at premium restaurants as gourmet versions and not as fast food.

Through the 1990s Nirula's faced heated competition from local and international fast food outlets and by 1995 there was only one Nirula's left in the city. The quality also went down and it soon closed its doors for good. 

While Kathmandu is now teeming with fast food outlets, many still reminisce about Nirula's as the place that they had their first pizza in. Their most popular pizza was the salami pizza, also their cheapest meat pizza.

Acquisition 

In 2006, Navis Capital Partners bought Nirula's. In 2007, the original Connaught Place outlet moved to K-Block, Connaught Place, while the adjacent Potpourri moved to N block, Outer Circle. Also in 2007, Nirula's opened India's first ice cream museum inside its ice cream factory in Noida. In the same year, the chain introduced three new outlet formats, including "Nirula's Express", Food Court Unit and Ice-Cream Kiosks, with the first Express outlet opening at the Delhi Airport.

In 2012, Navis "agreed to sell its 100% stake in Nirula's Group," to A2Z Excursions Pvt. Ltd for an undisclosed amount.

Today the chain has outlets across North India, in Delhi, Gurugram, Faridabad, Noida, Greater Noida, Ghaziabad, Kanpur, Lucknow, Bhiwadi, Dehradun, and Patna.

Famous Food Items 
 Hot Chocolate Fudge Sundae
 21 Love Ice Cream
 Banana Split
 Lime Ice - an Ice Cream Soda
 Pineapple Ice Cream Soda
 Chilli Chicken Pizza
 Chicken Curry with Naan
 Cakes and Pastries
 Mutton Sausage Pizza

Restaurant Locations
 Delhi: Connaught Place, Roop Nagar, Lodhi Road, Hauz Khas, Amar Colony, Bhikaji Cama Place, Kirti Nagar, Dwarka, Janakpuri, Paschim Vihar, Greater Kailash Part II, Karol Bagh, New Friends Colony, Preet Vihar, Punjabi Bagh, Vasant Kunj, Vasant Vihar, Bhikaji Cama Place, Shahdara, Mayur Vihar
 Haryana: Faridabad, Gurugram
 Uttar Pradesh: Noida, Greater Noida, Ghaziabad
 Uttarakhand: Mussoorie, Dehradun
 Bihar: Patna

Restaurant formats
 Nirula's 'Family-style' outlets: Quick service with take-away, home delivery and online ordering
 Nirula's Express: Take away-only
 Fuel Station Outlets.
 Potpourri: Fully waiter served, multi-cuisine restaurant chain
 Nirula's 21: Ice cream parlours
 Pegasus bar

References

External links
 Nirula's official website
 Nirula's keeps up with changing palate

Restaurants in Delhi
1934 establishments in India
Food and drink companies based in Delhi
Fast-food franchises
Fast-food chains of India
Ice cream parlors
Catering and food service companies of India
Restaurants established in 1934